The last four stages of the 2009 Copa Santander Libertadores are the knockout stages: the Round of 16, the Quarterfinals, the Semifinals, and the Finals.

Format
The remaining stages of the tournament constitute a single-elimination tournament. In each stage, the teams will play an opponent in a two-legged tie on a home-away basis. Each team will earn three points for a win, one point for a draw, and zero points for a loss. The team with the most points at the end of each tie will advance.

Tie-breaking
The following criteria will be used for breaking ties on points:
Goal difference
Goals scored
Away goals
Penalty shootout

Seeding
The 16 qualified teams in the knockout round will be seeded according to their results in the group stage. The top teams from each group are seeded 1-8, with the team with the most points as seed 1 and the team with the least as seed 8. The second-best teams from each group are seeded 9-16, with the team with the most points as seed 9 and the team with the least as seed 16. Teams with a higher seed will play the second leg of each tie at home.

Bracket

Round of 16
The Round of 16 began on May 5. Team #1, as the higher seeded team, played the second leg at home.

Guadalajara and San Luis withdrew from the tournament after an agreement on an alternative venue for the first legs, both scheduled to be played in Mexico, was unable to be agreed upon following concerns raised by both Nacional and São Paulo over the Swine flu outbreak in Mexico.

First leg

Second leg

Sport Recife 3–3 Palmeiras on points, Sport Recife & Palmeiras tied on goal difference and goals scored. Palmeiras won 3–1 on penalties.

Caracas 3–3 Deportivo Cuenca on points. Caracas won +3 on goal difference.

Grêmio won 6–0 on points.

Cruzeiro won 6–0 on points.

Estudiantes won 4–1 on points.

Defensor Sporting won 4–1 on points.

Quarterfinals
Team #1, as the higher seed, will play the second leg at home.

First leg

Second leg

Nacional 2–2 Palmeiras on points. Nacional and Palmeiras tied on goal difference and goals scored. Nacional advances on away goals.

Grêmio 2−2 Caracas on points. Grêmio and Caracas tied on goal difference and goals scored. Grêmio advances on away goals.

Estudiantes advances 6–0 on points.

Cruzeiro advances 6–0 on points.

Semifinals

First leg

Second leg

Estudiantes advances 6–0 on points.

Cruzeiro advances 4–1 on points.

Finals

The Finals was played on July 8 and 15.

|}

First leg

Second leg

Footnotes

A. Guadalajara and San Luis withdrew from the tournament following concerns raised by both Nacional and São Paulo over the H1N1 flu outbreak in Mexico, South American teams refused to travel to Mexico to play the match; no agreement was reached on alternative venues for the first-leg matches, both scheduled to be played in Mexico. Both Guadalajara and San Luis were later secured a place in the round of 16 for the 2010 Copa Libertadores.
l.

References

External links
CONMEBOL's official website 

Knockout stages